Five ships of the Royal Australian Navy have been named HMAS Sydney, after Sydney, the capital city of New South Wales.

, a Town-class light cruiser launched in 1912, decommissioned in 1928, and broken up for scrap
, a Leander-class light cruiser launched in 1934, and sunk following a battle with the German auxiliary cruiser Kormoran on 19 November 1941
, a Majestic-class light aircraft carrier launched in 1944, decommissioned in 1973, and broken up for scrap
, an Adelaide-class guided missile frigate launched in 1980, and decommissioned in 2015
, a Hobart-class air warfare destroyer in service since 2020

Battle honours
Between them, vessels named HMAS Sydney have been awarded fourteen battle honours by the Royal Australian Navy. These include two of the only three battle honours awarded in the 20th century for an action involving a single opposing ship:

 Rabaul 1914
 Emden 1914
 North Sea 1916–18
 Calabria 1940
 Spada 1940
 Mediterranean 1940
 Kormoran 1941
 Korea 1951–52
 Malaysia 1964
 Vietnam 1965–72
 Kuwait 1991
 East Timor 1999
 Persian Gulf 2001–03
 Iraq 2003

References

External links
  [CC-By-SA]

Royal Australian Navy ship names